NRR may refer to:

Club 
 Newport Reading Room, a gentlemen's club in Newport, Rhode Island

Electronic mail 
 No Reply Required in the subject field of an email

Law and regulation 
 National Recording Registry in the United States
 Non-Repudiation of receipt, a legal acknowledgement of origination/authorship of a document (as per internet RFC4130)
 Office of Nuclear Reactor Regulation in the United States

Medicine/science 
 Net reproduction rate in human fertility
 Nitrogen reduction reaction, the conversion of N2 to ammonia
 Noise reduction ratings in hearing protectors

Music 
 National Rock Review, an American website for rock music reviews and interviews

Sports 
 Net run rate in cricket

Places 
 IATA code of José Aponte de la Torre Airport in Ceiba, Puerto Rico